The Otowi Suspension Bridge, spanning the Rio Grande River near San Ildefonso, New Mexico, is a wooden suspension bridge built in 1924.  It was listed on the National Register of Historic Places in 1997. The bridge has been closed to vehicular traffic since the late 1940s, when a two-lane steel bridge was constructed just north of it.

In its 1996 NRHP nomination, it is asserted to be significant in the areas of transportation and engineering.  It was important for having opened a large part of New Mexico to automobile traffic, including the site of the Los Alamos National Laboratory, which became nationally important during World War II.  It was also the only public highway suspension bridge in the state and was the best-rated bridge in the state in a 1987 survey.

It was a contributing property in the listing of the Otowi Historic District to the National Register in 1975.

See also

National Register of Historic Places listings in Santa Fe County, New Mexico

References

Bridges completed in 1924
Buildings and structures in Santa Fe County, New Mexico
Road bridges on the National Register of Historic Places in New Mexico
Suspension bridges in the United States
National Register of Historic Places in Santa Fe County, New Mexico
Bridges over the Rio Grande
Towers in New Mexico
Wooden bridges in the United States